Celia Margaret Fremlin (20 June 1914 – 16 June 2009) was an English writer of mystery fiction.

Life
Celia was born in Kingsbury, now part of London, England. She was the daughter of Heaver Fremlin and Margaret Addiscott. Her older brother, John H. Fremlin, later became a nuclear physicist.

Fremlin studied Classics at Somerville College, University of Oxford. From 1942 to 2000 she lived in Hampstead, London. In 1942 she married Elia Goller, with whom she had three children; he died in 1968. In 1985, Fremlin married Leslie Minchin, who died in 1999. Her many crime novels and stories helped modernize the sensation novel tradition by introducing criminal and (rarely) supernatural elements into domestic settings. Her 1958 novel The Hours Before Dawn won the Edgar Award in 1960.

Fremlin was involved in Mass-Observation during the war, and published War Factory with Tom Harrisson in 1943.

With Jeffrey Barnard, she was co-presenter of a BBC2 documentary, Night and Day, describing diurnal and nocturnal London, broadcast on 23 January 1987.

Fremlin was an advocate of assisted suicide and euthanasia. In a newspaper interview she admitted to assisting four people to die. In 1983 civil proceedings were brought against her as one of the five members of the EXIT Executive committee which had published A Guide to Self Deliverance, but the court refused to declare the booklet unlawful.

She was also involved with the Progressive League.

Writing

Lucy Lethbridge has written of Fremlin's work that "almost all her novels centring round the home as the harbour of a particularly horrible, intimate, terror".

Some of her novels have been reissued since her death.

Death
She died on 16 June 2009 in Bournemouth.

Bibliography

Manners and Society
1940 – The Seven Chars of Chelsea
1943 – War Factory (with Tom Harrisson)

Novels
1958 – The Hours Before Dawn; (Edgar Award for Best Novel, 1960)
1959 – Uncle Paul
1961 – Seven Lean Years (US: Wait for the Wedding)
1963 – The Trouble Makers
1964 – The Jealous One
1967 – Prisoner's Base
1969 – Possession
1972 – Appointment with Yesterday
1975 – The Long Shadow
1977 – The Spider-Orchid
1980 – With No Crying
1982 – The Parasite Person
1990 – Listening in the Dusk
1991 – Dangerous Thoughts
1993 – The Echoing Stones
1994 – King of the World

Collections
1970 – Don't Go to Sleep in the Dark
1974 – By Horror Haunted
1984 – A Lovely Day to Die
2019 - Ghostly Stories

Poetry
1996 – Duet in Verse (with Leslie Minchin)

References

1914 births
2009 deaths
People from Kingsbury, London
English crime fiction writers
Edgar Award winners
Members of the Detection Club
English women novelists
Women mystery writers
20th-century English novelists
20th-century English women writers
Alumni of Somerville College, Oxford
People from Hampstead